Malealea is a village in the Mafeteng district, roughly 80km from Maseru in southern Lesotho. Located in the Makhaleng valley, ca. 3 kilometers west of the mouth of Botsoela river. The village can be reached from Matelile over 7 km gravel road. The 2006 census counts 613 inhabitants in "Makhomalong (Malealea)" and "Letlapeng (Malealea)"

History
 Rock paintings show that the area was inhabited by the San people.
 Between 1900 and the First World War, the English Mervyn Smith opened a trading station.
 In 1986, the trading station was bought by Mick and Di Jones and gradually transformed into a lodge.

Development 
The Malealea Development Trust  is a community run non-profit that strives to address the health, educational and environmental challenges faced by the Malealea community. Alongside its work to promote community involvement in tourism, the trust executes various activities and interventions in the priority areas of 1) Orphans and Vulnerable Children (OVCs) 2) Health and Well-being 3) Education and Training 4) General Community Development which includes income generation and environmental management.

References

Populated places in Mafeteng District